Louis Aimé Japy (1840–1916) was a French painter.

He was born in Doubs and travelled to Paris where he became a pupil of Camille Corot and Francois-Louis Francais. He is known for landscapes and fruit and flower still lifes.
He died in Paris.

References

 
Louis Aimé Japy on Artnet

External links
 

1840 births
1916 deaths
People from Doubs
19th-century French painters
French male painters
20th-century French painters
20th-century French male artists
19th-century French male artists